Banasura Hill is one of the tallest mountains in the Western Ghats of the Wayanad district, Kerala, India. The hill is named after Banasura, a mythical character of Indian legends. It is one of the highest peaks exceeding 2,000m between Nilgiris and Himalayas after Chembra Peak.

Geography
It lies off the state highway from Kuttiady to Mananthavady. Mananthavady which lies 25 km away is the closest town and the closest state transport depot. The closest National Highway is NH 766 that passes through Kalpetta which is about 37 km away.

Trekking routes and visitor information

One has to take a deviation at Vellamunda village and go via Pulinjal to reach the peak. About 1.5 km from Pulinjal you pass by Banasura Hill Resort, unique for its rammed-earth architecture. About 500 meters beyond the resort begins a treacherous but adventurous track. Along the way there is a thunderous waterfall that locals call "Meenmutty". It is a good three-hour climb to the top of the hill. The view from there is spectacular. Permission from the North Wayanad Forest Division office located at Mananthavady has to be obtained for trekking up Banasura Hill. At the foot of the hill is the Banasura Sagar Dam, the largest earth dam in India.  The dam is another point from where one can start the trek up Banasura Hill.

Flora and fauna
The narrow trail that leads up to the top of the hill winds through thick tropical vegetation. The flora includes some rare medicinal plants.  The fauna found en route consist of monkeys, wild boars, deer and wild elephants.

Tribes and local history
There are four tribal settlements at the foot of the Banasura Hill belonging largely to the Kurichiya tribe. The Kurichiyas have a martial tradition, and are experts with the bow and arrow. When Kerala Varma Pazhassi Raja revolted against the British for imposing exorbitant tax on agricultural products, and fled to the forests of Wayanad to fight a long-drawn guerilla war against them, it was to these Kurichiya tribesmen that the Pazhassi Raja turned for support. The Pazhassi Raja used their knowledge of the topography of the area to inflict defeats on the British forces. The rugged and thickly forested terrain around Banasura Hill with numerous caves, streams and watercourses formed an ideal hiding place for the Pazhassi Raja. In modern days, the higher elevations are inhabited by descendants of the Pazhassi Raja who have set up an intricate system of Ziplines and swinging ropes to traverse the network of tree houses they've constructed.

See also
Banasura Sagar Dam
Kurichiya tribe
Pazhassi Raja

References

External links 

 Official Website for Department of Tourism
 THE HINDU

 Mountains of the Western Ghats
 Mountains of Kerala
 Geography of Wayanad district